Albalate del Arzobispo is a municipality located in the province of Teruel, Aragon, Spain. According to the 2004 census (INE), the municipality had a population of 2,180 inhabitants.

Monuments 
This is a beautiful town of Moorish origin, although the remains have been found near dizygotic (s. VI). Noted for its steep streets and its well-preserved Gothic castle.
It also stresses the Church of the Assumption of the fifteenth century, the oil mill and the Chapel of Arcos, among many other attractions.
He belonged to the miter Zaragoza for over six centuries since it was donated in 1149. The houses are arranged around a hill crowned by the castle-palace, which was the episcopal residence.

References

External links 

 Official municipal webpage

Municipalities in the Province of Teruel